Kisekka is a Ugandan surname. Notable people with the surname include:

Frank Kisekka (born 1926), Ugandan boxer
Ronnie Kisekka (born 1993), Ugandan footballer
Samson Kisekka (1912–1999), Ugandan politician

Surnames of African origin